Capolat is a municipality in the comarca of Berguedà, Catalonia, Spain.

The geography is mountainous reaching 1500 meters about sea level.
The population has always been sparcly settled due to the topography, like almost the whole region, the population peeked in the nineteenth century, and since then it has been gradually declining .

Economy 
The economy is chiefly agricultural, with a particular prevalence of animal husbandry and dryland farming.
A good part of the territory is occupied by forests of pines, oaks and holm oaks (wood is one of the foundations of the economy) and there are also extensions of crops of potatoes, wheat and corn, almost all farms raise livestock (cattle, pigs and lambs, especially)

History
The town sprang up around Capolat Castle home of the local aristocratic familty. Bishop Nantigís of Urgell founded a Benedictine Monastery here on 13 December 899. In 905 the monastery was gifted by Adalaiz, countess daughter of Counts Suniari and Richildis,  the whole of Castell de l'Espunyola to the monastery of Sant Joan de les Abadesses. There are no records of the monastery this.

The parish church of Sant Martí de Coforb is first mentioned in the act of consecration of the cathedral of Urgell of 839. The Romanesque church of Sant Serni de Terrers at the north west of the commune dates to the 13th century.

Sites of interest 
The municipality has three Romanesque churches of interest:
 Church of Sant Salvador de Capolat
 Church of Sant Andreu de la Serreta
 Church of Sant Serni de la Torre

References

External links 
 Government data pages 

Municipalities in Berguedà
Populated places in Berguedà